Pool A of the 2019 Rugby World Cup began on 20 September 2019. The pool included hosts Japan, and previous 2015 Rugby World Cup quarter-finalists Ireland and Scotland. They were joined by the European qualifier, Russia, and Samoa, the winner of the European-Oceania Cross-Regional play-off.

Japan won all four of their matches, including surprise victories over both Ireland and Scotland, to finish top of the pool and become the first Asian nation to reach a Rugby World Cup quarter-final. Ireland picked up a bonus point in each of their matches, and their victory over Scotland in their opening pool match proved the difference between the two sides in the hunt for second place. Samoa finished in fourth place, their only win coming against bottom-placed Russia.

Overview
The opening match of the 2019 Rugby World Cup was played in Pool A with Japan scoring a 30–10 win over Russia. Kotaro Matsushima became the first Japanese player to score a hat-trick at a World Cup. For the Russian side, Kirill Golosnitsky scored the first try of the tournament after four minutes – the fastest try ever scored in the opening match of a World Cup. Two days later, Ireland defeated Scotland 27–3. On 24 September, Samoa played their first match against Russia in Kumagaya. Despite Samoa's being reduced to 13 men after Rey Lee-Lo and Motu Matu'u were sin-binned within two minutes of each other, Russia could not capitalise on their advantage and Samoa went on to win 34–9. Four days later, hosts Japan defeated Ireland 19–12, scoring four out of six penalties. While it was an upset win for Japan, World Rugby later admitted three of the four offside penalties were incorrectly awarded to Japan. Kenki Fukuoka scored a try in the 58th minute to give Japan a two-point lead after Ireland's Garry Ringrose and Rob Kearney had scored the opening two tries. Yu Tamura's conversion and fourth successful penalty kick sealed the result for Japan. Scotland recorded their first victory of the World Cup with a 34–0 whitewash victory over Samoa in muggy conditions in Kobe, with Samoan captain Jack Lam stating that the rugby ball was "a bar of soap."

Three days later, Kobe Misaki Stadium held another match in Pool A – this time it was Ireland, who would whitewash their opponents (Russia) in a 35–0 victory with five different players getting tries for the Irish. The Irish though, did not have everything go right with Jordi Murphy being subbed off in the 27th minute due to a possible rib injury, which added to the Irish back row pain after losing Jack Conan earlier in the tournament. Japan recorded their third victory over Samoa in Toyota with a 85th minute try from Kotaro Matsushima sealing the Japanese a 38–19 bonus point victory. Russia in the final match of the tournament was hammered by Scotland 61–0 with George Horne scoring a hat-trick as the Scots became the first team in World Cup history to not concede a point from two World Cup matches. A red card to Bundee Aki in the 29th minute forced Ireland to go down to 14 men but that was the only blemish with Ireland winning 47–5 over Samoa in Fukuoka. Johnny Sexton scoring two tries for the Irish. Typhoon Hagibis saw the Japan–Scotland match under threat with the Scottish Rugby Union demanding legal action if it was cancelled. But after an inspection deemed the match to go ahead, Japan held their nerve against a fast-finishing Scotland to take home a 28–21 victory with Kenki Fukuoka scoring two tries. The win saw Japan become the first Tier 2 team to qualify since 2007, as they topped the group while Ireland finished in second place.

Standings

All times are local Japan Standard Time (UTC+08)

Japan vs Russia

Notes:
This was the first Rugby World Cup opener not to feature a Tier 1 nation.
Kotaro Matsushima (Japan) became the first Japanese player to score a hat-trick at a World Cup, and the first player to score one in a Rugby World Cup opener.
Russia's try was the fastest to be scored in an opening match of a Rugby World Cup.

Ireland vs Scotland

Notes:
This was the first meeting between the two nations at a neutral venue.

Russia vs Samoa

Notes:
This was the first meeting between the two nations.
Ahsee Tuala was due to start the game, but was replaced with Henry Taefu following injury ahead of kick off.

Japan vs Ireland

Notes:
Will Tupou was due to start the game, but was replaced by 	Lomano Lemeki due to injury ahead of kick off.
Iain Henderson (Ireland) earned his 50th test cap.
This is Japan's first victory over Ireland.
This is Ireland's first Rugby World Cup pool stage loss since losing 30–15 to Argentina during the 2007 Rugby World Cup.
This is Ireland's first loss to a Tier 2 nation since losing 40–25 to Samoa in 1996.
This is the first time that Ireland has failed to score any points in the second half of a match since their match against France in the 2016 Six Nations Championship.

Scotland vs Samoa

Notes:
This is the first time since beating Italy 29–0 in 2017 that Scotland have kept their opponents scoreless, and the first time ever against Samoa. The last time they did so at a Rugby World Cup was in 2007, when they beat Romania 42–0.
This is the first time that Samoa has failed to score any points in a Rugby World Cup match.

Ireland vs Russia

Notes:
Igor Galinovskiy (Russia) earned his 50th test cap.

Japan vs Samoa

Notes:
Ben O'Keeffe was due to be part of the officiating team for this game, but swapped with Angus Gardner's appointment between England and Argentina.

Scotland vs Russia

Notes:
This is the first meeting between the two nations.
Vladimir Ostroushko (Russia) earned his 50th test cap.
Scotland became the first team to hold their opponents to nil points more than once in a single World Cup campaign.
Mathieu Raynal was due to referee this game but withdrew ahead of kick off due to illness – Wayne Barnes stepped up from assistant with Alexandre Ruiz covering the assistant role.

Ireland vs Samoa

Japan vs Scotland

Notes:
This was Scotland's 700th test match.
This was Japan's first win over Scotland.
This was the first time that a Tier 2 nation had defeated two Tier 1 nations in a single World Cup tournament.
With this win, Japan topped the pool and advanced to the quarter-finals for the first time – the first Asian side to do so.
Japan became the first Tier 2 nation since Fiji in 2007, and the fourth ever, to advance to the quarter-finals.
Japan became the first Tier 2 nation to top their pool and win all of their pool games.
The game was at risk of cancellation due to the after effects of Typhoon Hagibis the previous night. There was a lot of determination that, of all games, this one would be played. During the early hours of that morning a clean up operation was carried out by a large number of local residents. After an appeal put out by stadium management, they had spent the night in the stadium to be sure of being there as soon as the worst of the typhoon had passed. To get the venue match-ready mud had to be cleaned up and the entire pitch was dried by hand with towels. It was passed safe by 1100 and the game went ahead.

References

Pool A
2019–20 in Japanese rugby union
2019–20 in Scottish rugby union
2019–20 in Irish rugby union